The following is a list of famous or notable Portuguese language poets:

Angola
 Agostinho Neto
 Alda Lara
 António Jacinto
 Ondjaki
 Pepetela
 Viriato da Cruz
 Tomaz Vieira da Cruz

Brazil
 Adalgisa Nery
 Alberto de Oliveira
 Alphonsus de Guimaraens
 Alvarenga Peixoto
 Álvares de Azevedo
 Ana Cristina César
 Antônio Gonçalves Dias
 António Vieira
 Augusto de Lima
 Augusto dos Anjos
 Bernardo Guimarães
 Carlos Drummond de Andrade
 Casimiro de Abreu
 Castro Alves
 Cazuza
 Cecília Meireles
 Cláudio Manuel da Costa
 Clarice Lispector
 Cora Coralina
 Cruz e Souza
 Cyro dos Anjos
 Dante Milano
 Fabrício Carpi Nejar
 Ferreira Gullar
 Gilberto Mendonça Teles
 Gregório "Boca do Inferno" de Matos Guerra
 Gonçalves Dias
 Haroldo de Campos
 Henriqueta Lisboa
 Hilda Hilst
 João Cabral de Melo Neto
 João da Cruz e Sousa
 Joaquim Maria Machado de Assis
 José de Alencar
 Jorge de Lima
 José de Mesquita
 José de Santa Rita Durão
 Junqueira Freire
 Manuel Bandeira
 Manuel de Abreu
 Mário de Andrade
 Menotti del Picchia
 Murilo Mendes
 Olavo Bilac
 Oswald de Andrade
 Paulo Leminski
 Pedro Kilkerry
 Raimundo Correia
 Santa Rita Durão
 Tomás Antônio Gonzaga
 Vinicius de Moraes

Cape Verde
 Aguinaldo Fonseca
 Arménio Vieira
 Jorge Barbosa
 Osvaldo Alcântara
 Ovídio Martins

East Timor
 Fernando Sylvan
 Francisco Borja da Costa

Galicia (Spain)
 Eduardo Blanco Amor
 Xohán de Cangas
 Luisa Castro
 Rosalía de Castro
 Martín Codax
 Álvaro Cunqueiro
 Manuel Curros Enríquez
 Celso Emilio Ferreiro
 Airas Nunes
 Eduardo Pondal
 Eladio Rodríguez
 Claudio Rodríguez Fer
 Ramón Sampedro

Goa (India)
 Adeodato Barreto
 Laxmanrao Sardessai
 Vimala Devi
 R. V. Pandit

Guinea-Bissau
 Abdulai Silá
 Vasco Cabral

Macau (China)
 José dos Santos Ferreira (Adé)

Mozambique
 Armando Guebuza
 Eduardo Mondlane
 Eduardo White
 José Craveirinha
 Luís Bernardo Honwana
 Marcelino dos Santos
 Mia Couto
 Noémia de Sousa
 Sebastião Alba
 Teodomiro Leite de Vasconcelos
 Ungulani Ba Ka Khosa

Portugal
 Al Berto
 Alberto de Lacerda
 Alexandre O'Neill
 Almada Negreiros
 Almeida Garrett
 Antero de Quental
 António Diniz da Cruz e Silva
 António Duarte Gomes Leal
 António Ferreira (poet)
 António Gedeão
 António Nobre
 António Reis
 Ary dos Santos
 Augusto Gil
 Bernardim Ribeiro
 Caetano da Costa Alegre
 Camilo Pessanha
 Carlos de Oliveira
 Cesário Verde
 Christovão Falcão
 David Mourão-Ferreira
 King Denis of Portugal
 Eugénio de Andrade
 Fernando Pessoa
 Fiama Hasse Pais Brandão
 Florbela Espanca
 Francisco Manoel de Nascimento, aka Filinto Elysio
 Francisco Rodrigues Lobo
 Francisco de Sá de Miranda (1481–1558)
 Garcia de Resende
 Gil Vicente
 Guerra Junqueiro
 Hélia Correia
 Herberto Helder
 Ibn Bassam
 Jerónimo Corte-Real
 João de Deus
 João-Maria Nabais
 Jorge de Sena
 José Agostinho de Macedo
 José António Camões
 José Carlos Ary dos Santos
 José dos Santos Ferreira
 José Gomes Ferreira
 José Régio
 José Saramago
 Judah Leon Abravanel
 Luís de Camões
 Manuel Alegre
 Manuel António Pina
 Manuel da Fonseca
 Manuel de Faria e Sousa
 Manuel Maria Barbosa du Bocage
 Maria Amália Vaz de Carvalho (1847–1921)
 Maria Teresa Horta
 Mário Cesariny de Vasconcelos
 Mário de Sá-Carneiro
 Miguel Torga
 Natália Correia
 Orlando da Costa
 Pedro Correia Garção
 Rui Knopfli
 Ruy Belo
 Sérgio Godinho
 Sophia de Mello Breyner Andresen
 Vasco da Gama Rodrigues
 Vasco Graça Moura
 Vitorino Nemésio
 Zeca Afonso

São Tomé and Príncipe
 Alda do Espirito Santo
 Caetano da Costa Alegre

See also

 Portuguese language literature
 Portuguese literature
 Portuguese poetry
 Literature of Brazil
 List of Portuguese people
 List of poets
 Instituto Camões

+
Portuguese language poets, List of
Portuguese language
Poets, List of Portuguese language
+